Cercado is a province in the northeastern parts of the Bolivian department of Oruro. Its capital is Oruro. The hamlet of Paria, established in 1535, was the first Spanish settlement in Bolivia and previously had been a regional capital of the Inca Empire.  Paria is located in Soracachi municipality.

Location
Cercado province is one of sixteen provinces in the Oruro Department. It is located between 17° 22' and 18° 35' South and between 66° 21' and 67° 20' West. 

It borders Tomas Barrón Province and La Paz Department in the northwest, Nor Carangas Province and Saucarí Province in the west, Poopó Province and Pantaléon Dalence Province in the southeast, and Cochabamba Department in the east and north.

The province extends over 135 km from North to South, and 105 km from east to west.

Geography 
Some of the highest mountains of the province are listed below:

Population
The main language of the province is Spanish, spoken by 96.7%, 43.3% of the population speak Quechua and 25.5% speak Aymara. 

The population increased from 213,755 inhabitants (1992 census) to 241,230 (2001 census), an increase of 12.9%. - 39.4% of the population is younger than 15 years old.  

18.6% of the population have no access to electricity, 67.5% have no sanitary facilities. 

16.3% of the population are employed in agriculture, 1.8% in mining, 11.9% in industry, 70.0% in general services (2001).

83.0% of the population are Catholics, 13.5% are Protestants (1992).

Division
The province comprises four municipalities which are further subdivided into cantons.

See also 
 Jach'a Uma
 Qala Qala

References 

Provinces of Oruro Department